The Salamandre River is a tributary of the south shore of the Broadback River which flows west to the Rupert Bay, located south of the James Bay. The Salamandre River flows in the municipality of Eeyou Istchee Baie-James (municipality), in the administrative region of Nord-du-Québec, in Quebec, in Canada.

The surface of the river is usually frozen from early November to mid-May, however, safe ice circulation is generally from mid-November to mid-April.

Geography 
The surrounding hydrographic slopes of the Salamandre River are:
North side: Broadback River;
East side: Broadback River, Quénonisca Lake, Rocher Lake, Nipukatasi River;
South side: Salamandre Lake, Quénonisca Lake, Opataouaga Lake;
West side: Lake Ouagama, Evans Lake.

This source is located at:
 Southwest of the mouth of the Salamandre River (confluence with the Broadback River;
 Southeast of Evans Lake;
 Northeast of downtown Matagami.

From its source, the Salamandre River flows over  according to the following segments:
 easterly to the west shore of Salamandre Lake;
 north-east across Salamandre Lake. Note: Salamandre Lake is the main body of water supplying the Salamandre River;
 to the North, forming a curve to the Northeast, to the confluence of a river (coming from the south-west);
 north to mouth.

Toponymy
Formerly, the Salamandre River was designated "Whitefish River" and "White Fish River".

The toponym “rivière Salamandre” was made official on December 5, 1968, at the Commission de toponymie du Québec, i.e. at the creation of this commission.

See also

References

External links 
Fact Sheet of the Commission de toponymie du Québec

Rivers of Nord-du-Québec
Eeyou Istchee James Bay
Broadback River drainage basin
Jamésie